Pim de la Parra (born 5 January 1940) is a Surinamese-Dutch film director.
 
Between 1967 and 1976, he directed films under the independent production company Scorpio Films with Dutch film director Wim Verstappen, who manages all of its achievements.

After a few short films, he began his career as an international director with Obsessions (1969), co-written by Martin Scorsese.
He co-produced Blue Movie (1971) by Wim Verstappen, which was one of the most erotic movies of its time, showing nudity with a realism that confounded critics and censorship authorities. It was followed by Frank en Eva (1973), Alicia (1974), Dakota (1975) and Mijn Nachten met Susan, Olga, Albert, Julie, Piet & Sandra (1975), these four films forming an erotic tetralogy written with Charles Gormley. In 1976, he directed Wan Pipel, the first film shot entirely with actors from Suriname.

Select filmography
Jongens, jongens wat een meid (1965)
Joszef Katùs (1966)
Obsessions a.k.a. Bezeten, Het Gat in de Muur (1969; scenario Pim de la Parra, Wim Verstappen and Martin Scorsese)
Rubia's Jungle (1970)
Blue Movie (1971)
The Burglar (1972)Frank en Eva (1973)Mijn Nachten met Susan, Olga, Albert, Julie, Piet & Sandra (1975)Wan Pipel (1976)Paul Chevrolet en de ultieme hallucinatie (1985)Als in een Roes... (1986)Odyssée d'Amour (1987)Lost in Amsterdam (1989)De nacht van de wilde ezels (1990)Let the Music Dance (1990)Dagboek van een zwakke yogi (1993; as Ronald da Silva)Dream of a Shadow (1996)Ala di (2006)Het geheim van de Saramacca rivier'' (2007; first film of the Surinamese Film Academy)

References

External links
 

1940 births
Living people
Dutch film directors
Surinamese male writers
Surinamese Jews
Dutch Sephardi Jews
Surinamese people of Jewish descent
Surinamese people of Portuguese descent
People from Paramaribo